Johann Albrecht Euler (27 November 1734 – 17 September 1800) was a Swiss-Russian astronomer and mathematician. Also known as Johann Albert Euler or John-Albert Euler, he was the first child born to the great Swiss mathematician Leonhard Euler (1707–1783), who had emigrated [for the first time] to Saint-Petersburg on 17 May 1727. His mother was Katharina Gsell (1707–1773) whose maternal grandmother was the famous scientific illustrator Maria Sibylla Merian (1647–1717) and whose father was the Swiss Baroque painter Georg Gsell (1673–1740) who had emigrated to Russia in 1716. Katharina married Leonhard Euler on 7 January 1734 and Johann Albert would be the eldest of their 13 children (only 5 of whom survived childhood). 

In 1754 he became a member of the Berlin Academy. In 1758, he served briefly as director of the Astronomical Calculation Institute (ARI).

On Euler's return to St. Petersburg in 1765, he was appointed as the chair of physics at the St. Petersburg Academy. In St. Petersburg, he lived in his father's house; Johann Albrecht's family occupied the ground floor. He won a total of seven international academy prizes.

In 1771, Euler was elected a foreign member of the Royal Swedish Academy of Sciences.

In 1789, his youngest daughter married James Bernoulli "the younger" (1759–1789) who died two months after the wedding in a drowning accident.

Works

External links
J. A. Euler's math genealogy
L. Euler's students
L. Euler's descendants
The Eulers

1734 births
1800 deaths
Scientists from Saint Petersburg
People from Sankt-Peterburgsky Uyezd
18th-century Swiss mathematicians
Members of the Prussian Academy of Sciences
Full members of the Saint Petersburg Academy of Sciences
Members of the Royal Swedish Academy of Sciences
Russian people of Swiss descent
18th-century mathematicians from the Russian Empire